Trachylepis thomensis, the São Tomé skink, is a species of skink found in São Tomé.

References

Trachylepis
Skinks of Africa
Vertebrates of São Tomé and Príncipe
Endemic vertebrates of São Tomé and Príncipe
Reptiles described in 2016
Taxa named by Luis M. P. Ceríaco
Taxa named by Mariana P. Marques
Taxa named by Aaron M. Bauer